Make Way for Ducklings is a sculpture by Nancy Schön, which recreates the duck family in Robert McCloskey's children's classic Make Way for Ducklings.

The original set of bronze statues was installed in the Boston Public Garden in 1987, and a copy was installed in Moscow at Novodevichy Park in 1991.

Boston
Make Way for Ducklings is installed in Boston Public Garden. The statue, installed October 4, 1987, was a tribute to Robert McCloskey "whose story ... has made the Boston Public Garden familiar to children throughout the world."

The work was surveyed by the Smithsonian Institution's "Save Outdoor Sculpture!" program in 1997.

Moscow

A sculpture, similar to the original set in the Boston Public Garden, was erected in Novodevichy Park in Moscow as part of the START Treaty by Acton, Massachusetts landscape and construction company Capizzi & Co. Inc. on July 30, 1991. The equipment, statues, cobblestones, and workers were all flown by the US Air Force in a C-5 containing the heavy equipment, diesel fuel, and other assorted tools they would need. Four of the ducks were stolen, one in 1991 and three in February 2000. Thieves hoping to sell the ducks as scrap metal cut the statues off at the legs. The ducks were replaced in September 2000 at a rededication ceremony attended by former President of the Soviet Union Mikhail Gorbachev.

References

External links

 

1987 sculptures
1987 establishments in Massachusetts
1991 establishments in Russia
Animal sculptures in Massachusetts
Animal sculptures in Russia
Boston Public Garden
Bronze sculptures in Massachusetts
Outdoor sculptures in Boston
Outdoor sculptures in Russia
Sculptures of birds in the United States
Statues in Boston
Statues in Russia
Stolen works of art
Vandalized works of art in Massachusetts
Vandalized works of art in Russia